Rebecca Jayne Wing (born 15 July 1992) is a British artistic gymnast from Farnborough, Hampshire. She was a member of the British 2008 Summer Olympics artistic gymnastics team and a member of the British team that came 6th at the 2007 World Championships in Stuttgart. She studied at Cove Secondary School and Farnborough Sixth Form College where she achieved straight A grades in her A Levels of Maths, Psychology, Biology and PE. After originally obtaining a place at the University of Exeter, Wing decided to take a gap year before obtaining a scholarship to Stanford University to compete for their NCAA gymnastics team as Class of 2015.

References

External links
 
 
 
 
 

1992 births
Living people
British female artistic gymnasts
English female artistic gymnasts
Olympic gymnasts of Great Britain
Gymnasts at the 2008 Summer Olympics
Commonwealth Games silver medallists for England
Commonwealth Games medallists in gymnastics
Gymnasts at the 2010 Commonwealth Games
Stanford Cardinal women's gymnasts
Medallists at the 2010 Commonwealth Games